The Light Artillery Rocket System (or LARS) is a series of West German vehicle mounted multi-barrel rocket launchers designed for rapid concentration of fire on designated targets. The rockets are of 110 mm caliber. The usual mounting was a lightly armoured Magirus or MAN 6x6 truck. 36 rockets were mounted in two clusters of 18. The weapon entered service in 1969 and was phased out by 1998 and replaced by the M270 Multiple Launch Rocket System.

References

External links
http://hsfeatures.com/features04/man6x6idw_1.htm

Wheeled self-propelled rocket launchers
Self-propelled artillery of Germany
Military vehicles introduced in the 1960s